Nansan Town is a town under the jurisdiction of Zhenkang County, Lincang Prefecture, Yunnan Province, China.

References
Overview - Nansan Town, Zhenkang New Rural Digital Information Network 

Township-level divisions of Lincang
Towns of Yunnan
China–Myanmar border crossings